West 54 Records was a jazz record label active during the late 1970s.

Discography

References

Jazz record labels